The 2014 Aegon International was a combined men's and women's tennis tournament played on outdoor grass courts. It was the 40th edition of the event for the women and the 6th edition for the men. It was classified as a WTA Premier tournament on the 2014 WTA Tour and as an ATP World Tour 250 series on the 2014 ATP World Tour. The event took place at the Devonshire Park Lawn Tennis Club in Eastbourne, England from 16 June through 21 June 2014.

Points and prize money

Point distribution

Prize money

ATP singles main-draw entrants

Seeds

 1 Rankings are as of 9 June 2014.

Other entrants
The following players received wildcards into the main draw:
 Kyle Edmund
 Daniel Evans
 James Ward

The following players received entry from the qualifying draw:
 Chris Guccione
 Tobias Kamke
 Andrey Kuznetsov
 Blaž Rola

The following player received entry as a lucky loser:
 Víctor Estrella Burgos

Withdrawals
Before the tournament
 Ivan Dodig
 Alexandr Dolgopolov
 Teymuraz Gabashvili
 Andreas Seppi
 Radek Štěpánek

Retirements
 Víctor Estrella Burgos
 Blaž Rola

ATP doubles main-draw entrants

Seeds

1 Rankings are as of 9 June 2014.

Other entrants
The following pairs received wildcards into the doubles main draw:
  Colin Fleming /  Ross Hutchins
  Ken Skupski /  Neal Skupski

WTA singles main-draw entrants

Seeds

 1 Rankings are as of 9 June 2014.

Other entrants
The following players received wildcards into the main draw:
 Victoria Azarenka
 Johanna Konta
 Heather Watson

The following players received entry from the qualifying draw:
 Belinda Bencic
 Lauren Davis
 Hsieh Su-wei
 Francesca Schiavone

Withdrawals
Before the tournament
  Sorana Cîrstea --> replaced by Varvara Lepchenko
  Svetlana Kuznetsova --> replaced by Camila Giorgi
During the tournament
  Petra Kvitová (right leg injury)

WTA doubles main-draw entrants

Seeds

1 Rankings are as of 9 June 2014.

Other entrants
The following pairs received wildcards into the doubles main draw:
  Jelena Janković /  Francesca Schiavone
  Angelique Kerber /  Petra Kvitová
  Jocelyn Rae /  Anna Smith

Champions

Men's singles

  Feliciano López def.  Richard Gasquet, 6–3, 6–7(5–7), 7–5

Women's singles

  Madison Keys def.  Angelique Kerber, 6–3, 3–6, 7–5

Men's doubles

  Treat Huey /  Dominic Inglot def.  Alexander Peya /  Bruno Soares, 7–5, 5–7, [10–8]

Women's doubles

  Chan Hao-ching /  Chan Yung-jan def.  Martina Hingis /  Flavia Pennetta, 6–3, 5–7, [10–7]

References

External links
 Website

2014 WTA Tour
2014 ATP World Tour
2014
2014 in English tennis
June 2014 sports events in the United Kingdom